Olive Hill is a home rule-class city along Tygarts Creek in Carter County, Kentucky, in the United States. The population was 1,599 during the year 2010 U.S. Census.

History
Olive Hill began as a rural trading post established by the Henderson brothers in the first part of the 19th century. Although Olive Hill was allegedly named by Elias P. Davis for his friend Thomas Oliver, there is no evidence to support this popular contention. In 1881, the town was moved from a hillside location to the current location in the Tygarts Creek valley, where the Elizabethtown, Lexington, and Big Sandy Railroad had laid tracks. The hillside location become known as Old Olive Hill and now serves as the city's residential area. On March 24, 1884, Olive Hill incorporated as a city and served as the county seat of the short-lived Beckham County from February 9 to April 29, 1904.

The Chesapeake and Ohio Railway served Olive Hill and many other places on the railroad's Lexington Subdivision (running from Ashland to Lexington). The C&O merged into the Chessie System, which CSX Transportation later bought out, and after that CSX pulled up the railroad in the mid 1980s. Olive Hill retained and restored a passenger depot as well as a caboose ("John Hop Brown" Memorial Park).

According to George C. Wright in his A History of Blacks in Kentucky, volume 2, "In the small community of Olive Hill in 1917, several hundred white laborers at the brick-making General Refractories Company threatened to strike unless recently employed blacks were dismissed. After first refusing to meet with the leaders of the disgruntled workers, the company managers acceded to their demand and fired all the black workers,"(p.14).

Geography
Olive Hill is located in western Carter County at  (38.301007, -83.174091), primarily on the north side of Tygarts Creek, a tributary of the Ohio River. U.S. Route 60 passes through the city, leading east  to Grayson, the Carter County seat, and west  to Morehead.

Demographics
As of the census of 2000, there were 1,813 people, 791 households, and 488 families residing in the city. The population density was 904.1 people per square mile (348.3/km�). There were 886 housing units at an average density of 441.8 per square mile (170.2/km�). The racial makeup of the city was 98.73% White, 0.17% African American, 0.50% Native American, 0.11% from other races, and 0.50% from two or more races. Hispanic or Latino of any race were 0.61% of the population.

There were 791 households, out of which 26.5% had children under the age of 18 living with them, 44.5% were married couples living together, 14.5% had a female householder with no husband present, and 38.2% were non-families. 34.8% of all households were made up of individuals, and 18.6% had someone living alone who was 65 years of age or older. The average household size was 2.28 and the average family size was 2.93.

In the city, the population was spread out, with 24.5% under the age of 18, 8.3% from 18 to 24, 24.4% from 25 to 44, 24.4% from 45 to 64, and 18.4% who were 65 years of age or older. The median age was 39 years. For every 100 females, there were 83.7 males. For every 100 females age 18 and over, there were 78.0 males.

The median income for a household in the city was $22,958, and the median income for a family was $31,071. Males had a median income of $24,063 versus $19,191 for females. The per capita income for the city was $12,628. About 16.7% of families and 24.8% of the population were below the poverty line, including 35.1% of those under age 18 and 23.5% of those age 65 or over.

Education
Public education in Olive Hill is administered by Carter County School District, which operates Olive Hill Elementary School, West Carter Middle School, and West Carter High School.

Olive Hill has a public library, a branch of the Carter County Public Library.

Notable people
Olive Hill is the birthplace of country music singer and writer Tom T. Hall (The Story Teller), a fact that is noted on the "Welcome to Olive Hill" signs on the edges of town.

See also
 Other places named Olive Hill

References

External links

Olive Hill Trail Town
Olive Hill Chamber of Commerce
The Kentucky Atlas & Gazetteer

Cities in Carter County, Kentucky
Populated places established in 1884
Cities in Kentucky
1884 establishments in Kentucky